Robert Bodanzky, also known as Danton (born Isidor Bodanskie, 8 March 1879 – 2 November 1923), was an Austrian journalist, playwright, poet and artist. While he became famous for his apolitical poems before World War I, he turned an anarchist communist afterwards, writing political essays, plays and poems. He was the brother of the opera conductor Artur Bodanzky.

Works 
Mitislaw der Moderne, Glockenverlag, Vienna, 1907 (with Fritz Grünbaum, music by Franz Lehár)
Baron Trenck, 1908 (with Alfred Maria Willner, music by Felix Albini)
Der Liebeswalzer, 1908 (with Fritz Grünbaum, music by Karl Michael Ziehrer)
Der Graf von Luxemburg, 1909 (with Alfred Maria Willner and Leo Stein, music by Franz Lehár)
Gipsy Love, 1910 (with Alfred Maria Willner, music by Franz Lehár)
Endlich allein, 1914 (with Alfred Maria Willner, music by Franz Lehár)
Revolutionäre Dichtungen und Politische Essays, Verlag Erkenntns und Befreiung, 1925, Vienna, Klosterneuburg

Filmography
Éva, directed by Alfréd Deésy (Hungary, 1919)
The Count of Luxembourg, directed by Arthur Gregor (1926)
The Rogue Song, directed by Lionel Barrymore (1930, based on Gypsy Love)
, directed by Johannes Riemann (Austria, 1935)
Tanz ins Glück, directed by Alfred Stöger (Austria, 1951)
The Count of Luxembourg, directed by Werner Jacobs (West Germany, 1957)
The Count of Luxembourg, directed by Wolfgang Glück (West Germany, 1972)

References 
 Robert Bodanzky. In: Werner Portmann, Siegbert Wolf: „Ja, ich kämpfte“. Von Revolutionsträumen, 'Luftmenschen' und Kindern des Schtetls. Unrast, Münster 2006,  (in German).

External links

Austrian artists
20th-century Austrian poets
Austrian male poets
1879 births
1923 deaths
20th-century Austrian male writers
Austrian operetta librettists